Jocelyn Frenette (born January 11, 1976) is a former Canadian football Long snapper and offensive linemen for the Saskatchewan Roughriders of the Canadian Football League. He played CIS Football at Ottawa.

External links
Saskatchewan Roughriders bio

1976 births
Living people
Canadian football long snappers
Canadian football offensive linemen
Ottawa Gee-Gees football players
Players of Canadian football from Quebec
Saskatchewan Roughriders players
Canadian football people from Montreal